The Rise of the Krays is a 2015 low-budget film about the Kray twins who terrorised London during the 1950s and 1960s. The film was funded by Terry Brown and David Sullivan and was in development before the production team learned of Legend, the larger-budgeted studio film scheduled for release the same year.

Plot
The film focuses on the early life of the Krays before their downfall. In comparison with Legend it aims for a gritty authenticity with less glamorising, portraying The Twins as "horrible pieces of work".

Cast
Simon Cotton as Ronnie Kray 
Kevin Leslie as Reggie Kray  
Nicola Stapleton as Violet Kray
James Hepburn as Charlie Richardson
Phil Dunster as Dickie Baker

References

External links
 
 

2015 films
2010s biographical films
2010s crime thriller films
British biographical films
British crime thriller films
Hood films
Films set in London
Films set in the 1960s
British gangster films
Works about the Kray twins
Films about organised crime in the United Kingdom
2010s English-language films
2010s American films
2010s British films